A free-electron laser (FEL) is a (fourth generation) light source producing extremely brilliant and short pulses of radiation. An FEL functions and behaves in many ways like a laser, but instead of using stimulated emission from atomic or molecular excitations, it employs relativistic electrons as a gain medium. Radiation is generated by a bunch of electrons passing through a magnetic structure (called undulator or wiggler). In an FEL, this radiation is further amplified as the radiation re-interacts with the electron bunch such that the electrons start to emit coherently, thus allowing an exponential increase in overall radiation intensity. 

As electron kinetic energy and undulator parameters can be adapted as desired, free-electron lasers are tunable and can be built for a wider frequency range than any other type of laser, currently ranging in wavelength from microwaves, through terahertz radiation and infrared, to the visible spectrum, ultraviolet, and X-ray.

The first free-electron laser was developed by John Madey in 1971 at Stanford University using technology developed by Hans Motz and his coworkers, who built an undulator at Stanford in 1953, using the wiggler magnetic configuration. Madey used a 43 MeV electron beam and 5 m long wiggler to amplify a signal.

Beam creation 

To create an FEL, a beam of electrons is accelerated to almost the speed of light. The beam passes through a periodic arrangement of magnets with alternating poles across the beam path, which creates a side to side magnetic field. The direction of the beam is called the longitudinal direction, while the direction across the beam path is called transverse. This array of magnets is called an undulator or a wiggler, because the Lorentz force of the field forces the electrons in the beam to wiggle transversely, traveling along a sinusoidal path about the axis of the undulator.

The transverse acceleration of the electrons across this path results in the release of photons, which are monochromatic but still incoherent, because the electromagnetic waves from randomly distributed electrons interfere constructively and destructively in time. The resulting radiation power scales linearly with the number of electrons. Mirrors at each end of the undulator create an optical cavity, causing the radiation to form standing waves, or alternately an external excitation laser is provided.
The radiation becomes sufficiently strong that the transverse electric field of the radiation beam interacts with the transverse electron current created by the sinusoidal wiggling motion, causing some electrons to gain and others to lose energy to the optical field via the ponderomotive force.

This energy modulation evolves into electron density (current) modulations with a period of one optical wavelength. The electrons are thus longitudinally clumped into microbunches, separated by one optical wavelength along the axis. Whereas an undulator alone would cause the electrons to radiate independently (incoherently), the radiation emitted by the bunched electrons is in phase, and the fields add together coherently.

The radiation intensity grows, causing additional microbunching of the electrons, which continue to radiate in phase with each other. This process continues until the electrons are completely microbunched and the radiation reaches a saturated power several orders of magnitude higher than that of the undulator radiation.

The wavelength of the radiation emitted can be readily tuned by adjusting the energy of the electron beam or the magnetic-field strength of the undulators.

FELs are relativistic machines. The wavelength of the emitted radiation, is given by

 

or when the wiggler strength parameter , discussed below, is small

 

where  is the undulator wavelength (the spatial period of the magnetic field),  is the relativistic Lorentz factor and the proportionality constant depends on the undulator geometry and is of the order of 1.

This formula can be understood as a combination of two relativistic effects. Imagine you are sitting on an electron passing through the undulator. Due to Lorentz contraction the undulator is shortened by a  factor and the electron experiences much shorter undulator wavelength . However, the radiation emitted at this wavelength is observed in the laboratory frame of reference and the relativistic Doppler effect brings the second  factor to the above formula. In an X-ray FEL the typical undulator wavelength of 1 cm is transformed to X-ray wavelengths on the order of 1 nm by  ≈ 2000, i.e. the electrons have to travel with the speed of 0.9999998c.

Wiggler strength parameter K 

, a dimensionless parameter, defines the wiggler strength as the relationship between the length of a period and the radius of bend,

 

Expressed in practical units, the dimensionless undulator parameter is
.

Quantum effects 

In most cases, the theory of classical electromagnetism adequately accounts for the behavior of free electron lasers. For sufficiently short wavelengths, quantum effects of electron recoil and shot noise may have to be considered.

FEL construction

Free-electron lasers require the use of an electron accelerator with its associated shielding, as accelerated electrons can be a radiation hazard if not properly contained. These accelerators are typically powered by klystrons, which require a high-voltage supply. The electron beam must be maintained in a vacuum, which requires the use of numerous vacuum pumps along the beam path. While this equipment is bulky and expensive, free-electron lasers can achieve very high peak powers, and the tunability of FELs makes them highly desirable in many disciplines, including chemistry, structure determination of molecules in biology, medical diagnosis, and nondestructive testing.

Infrared and terahertz FELs
The Fritz Haber Institute in Berlin completed a mid-infrared and terahertz FEL in 2013.

X-ray FELs 
The lack of mirror materials that can reflect extreme ultraviolet and x-rays means that X-ray Free Electron Lasers (XFEL) need to work without a resonant cavity. Consequently, in an X-ray FEL (XFEL) the beam is produced by a single pass of radiation through the undulator. This requires that there be enough amplification over a single pass to produce an appropriate beam.

Hence, XFELs use long undulator sections that are tens or hundreds of meters long. This allows XFELs to produce the brightest X-ray pulses of any human-made x-ray source. The intense pulses from the X-ray laser lies in the principle of self-amplified spontaneous emission (SASE), which leads to microbunching. Initially all electrons are distributed evenly and emit only incoherent spontaneous radiation. Through the interaction of this radiation and the electrons' oscillations, they drift into microbunches separated by a distance equal to one radiation wavelength. This interaction drives all electrons to begin emitting coherent radiation. Emitted radiation can reinforce itself perfectly whereby wave crests and wave troughs are optimally superimposed on one another. This results in an exponential increase of emitted radiation power, leading to high beam intensities and laser-like properties. Examples of facilities operating on the SASE FEL principle include the Free electron LASer in Hamburg (FLASH), the Linac Coherent Light Source (LCLS) at the SLAC National Accelerator Laboratory, the European x-ray free electron laser (EuXFEL) in Hamburg, the SPring-8 Compact SASE Source (SCSS) in Japan, the SwissFEL at the Paul Scherrer Institute (Switzerland), the SACLA at the RIKEN Harima Institute in Japan, and the PAL-XFEL (Pohang Accelerator Laboratory X-ray Free-Electron Laser) in Korea.

In 2022, an upgrade to Stanford University’s Linac Coherent Light Source (LCLS-II) used temperatures around −271 °C to produce 106 pulses/second of near light-speed electrons, using superconducting niobium cavities.

Self-seeding 

One problem with SASE FELs is the lack of temporal coherence due to a noisy startup process. To avoid this, one can "seed" an FEL with a laser tuned to the resonance of the FEL. Such a temporally coherent seed can be produced by more conventional means, such as by high harmonic generation (HHG) using an optical laser pulse. This results in coherent amplification of the input signal; in effect, the output laser quality is characterized by the seed. While HHG seeds are available at wavelengths down to the extreme ultraviolet, seeding is not feasible at x-ray wavelengths due to the lack of conventional x-ray lasers.

In late 2010, in Italy, the seeded-FEL source FERMI@Elettra started commissioning, at the Trieste Synchrotron Laboratory. FERMI@Elettra is a single-pass FEL user-facility covering the wavelength range from 100 nm (12 eV) to 10 nm (124 eV), located next to the third-generation synchrotron radiation facility ELETTRA in Trieste, Italy.

In 2012, scientists working on the LCLS overcame the seeding limitation for x-ray wavelengths by self-seeding the laser with its own beam after being filtered through a diamond monochromator. The resulting intensity and monochromaticity of the beam were unprecedented and allowed new experiments to be conducted involving manipulating atoms and imaging molecules. Other labs around the world are incorporating the technique into their equipment.

Research

Biomedical

Basic research
Researchers have explored free-electron lasers as an alternative to synchrotron light sources that have been the workhorses of protein crystallography and cell biology.

Exceptionally bright and fast X-rays can image proteins using x-ray crystallography. This technique allows first-time imaging of proteins that do not stack in a way that allows imaging by conventional techniques, 25% of the total number of proteins. Resolutions of 0.8 nm have been achieved with pulse durations of 30 femtoseconds. To get a clear view, a resolution of 0.1–0.3 nm is required. The short pulse durations allow images of X-ray diffraction patterns to be recorded before the molecules are destroyed.  The bright, fast X-rays were produced at the Linac Coherent Light Source at SLAC. As of 2014 LCLS was the world's most powerful X-ray FEL.

Due to the increased repetition rates of the next-generation X-ray FEL sources, such as the European XFEL, the expected number of diffraction patterns is also expected to increase by a substantial amount.  The increase in the number of diffraction patterns will place a large strain on existing analysis methods. To combat this, several methods have been researched to sort the huge amount of data typical X-ray FEL experiments will generate.   While the various methods have been shown to be effective, it is clear that to pave the way towards single-particle X-ray FEL imaging at full repetition rates, several challenges have to be overcome before the next resolution revolution can be achieved.   

New biomarkers for metabolic diseases: taking advantage of the selectivity and sensitivity when combining infrared ion spectroscopy and mass spectrometry scientists can provide a structural fingerprint of small molecules in biological samples, like blood or urine. This new and unique methodology is generating exciting new possibilities to better understand metabolic diseases and develop novel diagnostic and therapeutic strategies.

Surgery 
Research by Glenn Edwards and colleagues at Vanderbilt University's FEL Center in 1994 found that soft tissues including skin, cornea, and brain tissue could be cut, or ablated, using infrared FEL wavelengths around 6.45 micrometres with minimal collateral damage to adjacent tissue. This led to surgeries on humans, the first ever using a free-electron laser. Starting in 1999, Copeland and Konrad performed three surgeries in which they resected meningioma brain tumors. Beginning in 2000, Joos and Mawn performed five surgeries that cut a window in the sheath of the optic nerve, to test the efficacy for optic nerve sheath fenestration. These eight surgeries produced results consistent with the standard of care and with the added benefit of minimal collateral damage. A review of FELs for medical uses is given in the 1st edition of Tunable Laser Applications.

Fat removal 
Several small, clinical lasers tunable in the 6 to 7 micrometre range with pulse structure and energy to give minimal collateral damage in soft tissue have been created. At Vanderbilt, there exists a Raman shifted system pumped by an Alexandrite laser.

Rox Anderson proposed the medical application of the free-electron laser in melting fats without harming the overlying skin. At infrared wavelengths, water in tissue was heated by the laser, but at wavelengths corresponding to 915, 1210 and 1720 nm, subsurface lipids were differentially heated more strongly than water. The possible applications of this selective photothermolysis (heating tissues using light) include the selective destruction of sebum lipids to treat acne, as well as targeting other lipids associated with cellulite and body fat as well as fatty plaques that form in arteries which can help treat atherosclerosis and heart disease.

Military 
FEL technology is being evaluated by the US Navy as a candidate for an antiaircraft and anti-missile directed-energy weapon. The Thomas Jefferson National Accelerator Facility's FEL has demonstrated over 14 kW power output. Compact multi-megawatt class FEL weapons are undergoing research. On June 9, 2009 the Office of Naval Research announced it had awarded Raytheon a contract to develop a 100 kW experimental FEL. On March 18, 2010 Boeing Directed Energy Systems announced the completion of an initial design for U.S. Naval use. A prototype FEL system was demonstrated, with a full-power prototype scheduled by 2018.

FEL Prize Winners 
The FEL prize is given to a person who has contributed significantly to the advancement of the field of Free-Electron Lasers. In addition, it gives the international FEL community the opportunity to recognize one of its members for her or his outstanding achievements.

 1988 John Madey
 1989 William Colson
 1990 Todd Smith and Luis Elias
 1991 Phillip Sprangle and Nikolai Vinokurov
 1992 Robert Phillips
 1993 Roger Warren
 1994 Alberto Renieri and Giuseppe Dattoli
 1995 Richard Pantell and George Bekefi
 1996 Charles Brau
 1997 Kwang-Je Kim
 1998 John Walsh
 1999 Claudio Pellegrini
 2000 Stephen V. Benson, Eisuke J. Minehara, and George R. Neil
 2001 Michel Billardon, Marie-Emmanuelle Couprie, and Jean-Michel Ortega
 2002 H. Alan Schwettman and Alexander F.G. van der Meer
 2003 Li-Hua Yu
 2004 Vladimir Litvinenko and Hiroyuki Hama
 2005 Avraham (Avi) Gover
 2006 Evgueni Saldin and Jörg Rossbach
 2007 Ilan Ben-Zvi and James Rosenzweig
 2008 Samuel Krinsky
 2009 David Dowell and Paul Emma
 2010 Sven Reiche
 2011 Tsumoru Shintake
 2012 John Galayda
 2013 Luca Giannessi and Young Uk Jeong
 2014 Zhirong Huang and William Fawley
 2015 Mikhail Yurkov and Evgeny Schneidmiller
 2017 Bruce Carlsten, Dinh Nguyen and Richard Sheffield
 2019 Enrico Allaria, Gennady Stupakov, and Alex Lumpkin
 2022 Brian McNeil and Ying Wu

Young Scientist FEL Award 
The Young Scientist FEL Award (or "Young Investigator FEL Prize") is intended to honor outstanding contributions to FEL science and technology from a person who is less than 35 years of age.

 2008 Michael Röhrs
 2009 Pavel Evtushenko
 2010 Guillaume Lambert
 2011 Marie Labat
 2012 Daniel F. Ratner
 2013 Dao Xiang
 2014 Erik Hemsing
 2015 Agostino Marinelli and Haixiao Deng
 2017 Eugenio Ferrari and Eléonore Roussel
 2019 Joe Duris and Chao Feng
 2022 Zhen Zhang, Jiawei Yan, and Svitozar Serkez

See also 

 Bremsstrahlung
 Cyclotron radiation
 Electron wake
 European X-ray free-electron laser
 Gyrotron
 International Linear Collider
 Synchrotron radiation
 Laser acronyms

References

Further reading

 
 Madey, John, Stimulated emission of radiation in periodically deflected electron beam, US Patent 38 22 410,1974
 
 
 
 
 
 "The FEL Program at Jefferson Lab" Jefferson Lab Free-Electron Laser Program
 
 Paolo Luchini, Hans Motz, Undulators and Free-electron Lasers, Oxford University Press, 1990.

External links 
 Chapter dedicated to XFEL, included in the web to learn crystallography CSIC
 Lightsources.org
 LCLS the Linac Coherent Light Source, the world's first hard x-ray FEL at the SLAC National Accelerator Laboratory
 FERMI, the new FEL at the ELETTRA synchrotron in Trieste
 Free-Electron Laser Open Book (National Academies Press) 
 The World Wide Web Virtual Library: Free-Electron Laser research and applications
 European XFEL
 PSI SwissFEL
 SPring-8 Compact SASE Source
 PAL-XFEL, South Korea
 Electron beam transport system and diagnostics of the Dresden FEL
 The Free Electron Laser for Infrared eXperiments FELIX
 W. M. Keck Free Electron Laser Center
 Jefferson Lab's Free-Electron Laser Program
 Free-Electron Lasers: The Next Generation by Davide Castelvecchi New Scientist, January 21, 2006
 Airborne megawatt class free-electron laser for defense and security
 FERMI@Elettra Free-Electron Laser Project
 Center for Free-Electron Laser Science (CFEL)
FELIX Laboratory, free-electron lasers in Nijmegen, the Netherlands

Electron beam
 
Medical equipment
Terahertz technology
Accelerator physics